Rajiv Gandhi Government Polytechnic (previously known as Arunachal Pradesh Polytechnic) is a multi-speciality, technology-oriented college located at Itanagar, Arunachal Pradesh. It is also the first polytechnic college in Arunachal Pradesh under the Arunachal Pradesh State Council for Technical Education (APSCTE), Government of Arunachal Pradesh.
Rajiv Gandhi Government Polytechnic has also earned the credit of being the first Institution in the state to achieve ISO 9001:2000 certification in June 2006.

Students' union
The welfare of the college is handled by the student union body or wing, also known as Students' Union of Rajiv Gandhi Government Polytechnic (SURGGP), at Itanagar. Every year, the cabinet member of the union is interchanged for the portfolio holding in a grand manner.

History
Arunachal Pradesh Polytechnic, now Rajiv Gandhi Government Polytechnic, is the first of its kind in the state. It was established in 2002 with the financial assistance from the World Bank under Technician Education III Project of the Ministry of Human Resource Development, Government of India. The institute was functioning initially in a rented building. In January 2005, it was shifted to its permanent campus near Dera Natung Government College, Itanagar.

Location
Rajiv Gandhi Government Polytechnic is located at Itanagar in the Papum Pare district of Arunachal Pradesh in the foothills of the Eastern Himalaya. It is 30 km from Banderdewa, the border between Assam and Arunachal Pradesh, and about 410 km from Guwahati.

References 

Engineering colleges in Arunachal Pradesh
Education in Itanagar
Educational Institutions in Arunachal Pradesh